The Old Attleboro Post Office is a historic post office building at 75 Park Street in Attleboro, Massachusetts.  It is a Classical Revival two story stone structure, faced in Indiana limestone, with granite steps leading to a monumental multi-column facade.  The interior lobby features a patterned marble floor.  The building was constructed in 1916 at a cost of $85,000.  Today it is no longer a post office. Instead it is divided between the city of Attleboro and Bristol County, which use it as office space.

The building was listed on the National Register of Historic Places in 1987.

See also 

National Register of Historic Places listings in Bristol County, Massachusetts
List of United States post offices

References 

Former post office buildings
Attleboro
Government buildings completed in 1916
Buildings and structures in Bristol County, Massachusetts
Neoclassical architecture in Massachusetts
Attleboro, Massachusetts
National Register of Historic Places in Bristol County, Massachusetts
1916 establishments in Massachusetts